Yucatecan may refer to:

A hashtag made by Futuro Sureste, represents a speculative possibility in Yucatan
The Mexican state of Yucatán
The Yucatán Peninsula
The Yucatec Maya language and its speakers